Anyango is a surname. Notable people with the surname include:

Jane Anyango (born 1970), Kenyan peace activist
Pollyins Ochieng Anyango, Kenyan politician